Sablino is a station on the railway connecting Saint Petersburg and Moscow, close to Saint Petersburg. It is located in the urban-type settlement of Ulyanovka.

Railway stations in Saint Petersburg Railway Division